This is the list of the members of the European Parliament for Latvia in the 2009 to 2014 session. One person from Civic Union entered the Parliament in December 2011, bringing the number of MEPs back to 9.

List

Party representation

Notes

List
Latvia
2009